"No Time to Die" is the theme song for the James Bond film of the same name. Performed by American singer-songwriter Billie Eilish and written by Eilish and her brother and collaborator, Finneas O'Connell, the song features orchestration by Hans Zimmer and was produced by Finneas O'Connell and Stephen Lipson. It was released through Darkroom and Interscope Records on February 13, 2020. Seventeen years old at the time of recording, Eilish is the youngest artist to have recorded a James Bond theme in the history of the franchise.

"No Time to Die" debuted at the top of the UK Singles Chart and the Irish Singles Chart. It became Eilish's first number-one single in the UK and made her the first artist born in the 21st century to top the chart. The song is the second Bond theme overall to top the UK chart. "No Time to Die" debuted and peaked at number 16 on the US Billboard Hot 100.

"No Time to Die" received various accolades, including the Grammy Award for Best Song Written for Visual Media, the Golden Globe Award for Best Original Song, the Critics' Choice Movie Award for Best Song, and the Academy Award for Best Original Song, making it the third-ever and third consecutive Bond theme to win the Academy Award (after "Skyfall" by Adele in 2012 and "Writing's on the Wall" by Sam Smith in 2015). Eilish became the first person born in the 21st century to win an Academy Award.

Background and production
In an interview with Zane Lowe for Apple Music, Eilish said that she and her brother Finneas O'Connell used to make up songs they thought as possible themes for the James Bond film series, while thinking they would never get such an opportunity. After her August 30 concert in Ireland's Electric Picnic, Eilish and Finneas met Bond producer Barbara Broccoli, who then invited them to compose the theme for the upcoming No Time to Die, which they promptly accepted. They were given parts of the script and started to create the theme. The initial attempts, where Finneas tried to write the song with a guitar, stumbled on mutual writer's block by the siblings. Finneas later found a piano in the green room of a Texas arena and played a riff which would become the song's opening, and was described by Eilish as the spark for their composing process. After three days of composition, they recorded a demo in October, inside a bunk in their tour bus as it was parked in a Texas arena. Finneas added that after they finished writing, the two listened to all the previous theme songs to ensure their originality, "make sure that we weren't making something that just felt like we were copying other great songs". 

The demo was sent to Hans Zimmer's office in Los Angeles, and was the favorite of the prospect themes that he heard. On December 19, Eilish and Finneas flew to London to work with Zimmer, recording the song with a 70-person orchestra at George Martin's AIR Studios. Eilish said the process was more collaborative than she expected, and that "Hans was incredibly—like, easy to work with." Guitarist Johnny Marr, who was performing in Zimmer's score for the movie and was brought in to play in the song, declared that "we just kept coming back to 'reduce, reduce, reduce'", wanting something that reflected the musical simplicity of Eilish's usual output, where "the power is in the intensity of the performance." After seeing a rough cut of the film, Eilish decided to add in a climactic belting of the song's title.

Composition and lyrics
Musically, "No Time to Die" is an orchestral pop ballad with R&B influences. The track runs at 74 BPM and is in the key of E minor. It runs at four minutes and two seconds. Eilish's vocals span E3 to D5, which include a belted B4. According to Roisin O'Connor of The Independent, the song "features classic elements of the most memorable Bond themes including a slow build; a dark, shivery theme; and dramatic orchestration". Cassie Da Costa of The Daily Beast said the song "begins with moody, atmospheric piano music before Billie's pop-enunciated alto vibrato creeps in with depressive yet vague observations about love, loss, and violence". The song features orchestral arrangements by Hans Zimmer as well as Johnny Marr on guitar.

According to Sheldon Pearce of Pitchfork, the lyrics reflect the "betrayal hinted at in the film's trailer and embody the tension of espionage". In the chorus of the song, Eilish sings about a lover's betrayal, more specifically, Bond's belief that Madeleine betrayed him: "Was I stupid to love you?/ Was I reckless to help?/Was it obvious to everybody else/That I'd fallen for a lie?/You were never on my side/Fool me once, fool me twice/Are you death or paradise?/Now you'll never see me cry/There's just no time to die."

Promotion
Eilish was announced as the performer of the theme song for the 25th film in the James Bond franchise in January 2020, initially via the franchise's official Twitter account. Eilish called the opportunity "a huge honor", and O'Connell said they "feel so so lucky to play a small role in such a legendary franchise". No Time to Die director Cary Joji Fukunaga described himself as a fan of the duo, and the film's producers, Michael G. Wilson and Barbara Broccoli, said the song is "impeccably crafted". At the 92nd Academy Awards, Eilish said the ballad was "written" and "done".

Eilish performed the song live for the first time at the 2020 Brit Awards on February 18, 2020, alongside Finneas, Zimmer and Marr.

Music video
The official music video for "No Time to Die" was released on October 1, 2020. The video was shot in black-and-white clip and was directed by Daniel Kleinman, who has designed every title sequence for the James Bond series since 1995 (with the exception of Quantum of Solace in 2008). In the visual, it shows Eilish singing behind an old-fashioned microphone, as she stares into the camera interspersed with scenes from the film showing James Bond (Daniel Craig) and Madeleine Swann (Léa Seydoux) engaging in a love affair. The song also shows Safin in the opening scene, and Madeleine finding his shattered mask. Justin Curto, writing for Vulture magazine, mentions the video has "smokey lounge-singer vibes". Rachel McRady of Entertainment Tonight commented that it was clear that "Madeleine betrays 007 in some way as the video continuously shares shots of the agent looking distrustful as he gazes upon his ladylove".

Critical reception
Alexis Petridis of The Guardian gave an overall positive review, stating that "No Time to Die" is a "confident", and "appealing addition to the Bond theme canon." Chris Willman, writing for Variety, wrote that the track was one of the better James Bond themes to be written in the last 25 to 30 years. Roisin O'Connor of The Independent stated that "'No Time to Die' is one of the best Bond theme songs we've had in some time." Alexa Camp of Slant Magazine said, "the lush, darkly cinematic track falls in line with past 007 themes". Cassie Da Costa of The Daily Beast described the song as "not at the level" of Shirley Bassey's "Goldfinger" and Nancy Sinatra's "You Only Live Twice", and said it was certainly not "Eilish's best, but as of late, the Bond universe has been perfectly satisfied with good enough."

In June 2020, Billboard ranked "No Time to Die" as the 22nd best song of 2020 so far.

Accolades

Credits and personnel
Credits adapted from Tidal and 007.com.

 Billie Eilish – vocals, songwriting
 Finneas – production, songwriting, bass, percussion, piano, synthesizer, drum programming, vocal arrangement
 Stephen Lipson – production, mixing
 Johnny Marr – guitar
 Hans Zimmer – orchestral arrangements
 Matt Dunkley – orchestral arrangements
 Rob Kinelski – mixing
 Casey Cuayo – mix engineering
 Eli Heisler – mix engineering
 John Greenham – mastering

Track listing
Digital Download
"No Time to Die"

7-inch single
"No Time to Die"
"No Time to Die" (Instrumental)

Limited Edition Record Store Day 7-inch single
"No time to Die" (Live at the BRIT Awards)
"No Time to Die" (Demo)

Charts

Weekly charts

Year-end charts

Certifications

Release history

See also

 List of number-one digital songs of 2020 (U.S.)
 List of number-one digital songs of 2020 (Canada)
 List of number-one singles of 2020 (Ireland)
 List of Official Audio Streaming Chart number ones of the 2020s
 List of top 10 singles in 2020 (Australia)
 List of UK Singles Chart number ones of the 2020s
 List of UK Singles Downloads Chart number ones of the 2020s
 List of UK Singles Sales Chart number ones
 List of UK top-ten singles in 2020

References

2020 singles
2020 songs
2020s ballads
Billie Eilish songs
Best Original Song Academy Award-winning songs
Best Original Song Golden Globe winning songs
Black-and-white music videos
Grammy Award for Best Song Written for Visual Media
Interscope Records singles
Irish Singles Chart number-one singles
Pop ballads
Song recordings produced by Stephen Lipson
Song recordings produced by Finneas O'Connell
Songs from James Bond films
Songs written by Billie Eilish
Songs written by Finneas O'Connell
UK Singles Chart number-one singles
Hans Zimmer